Potemnemus pristis is a species of beetle in the family Cerambycidae. It was described by Francis Polkinghorne Pascoe in 1866. It is known from Papua New Guinea and Moluccas.

References

Lamiini
Beetles described in 1866